Great Britain competed at the 1996 Summer Paralympics in Atlanta, United States.

Medallists

Paralympic sports

Demonstration sports
Great Britain also won Gold for Sailing at the 1996 Summer Paralympics which became an official part of the Paralympic program in the Sydney 2000 Paralympic Games.

See also
Great Britain at the 1996 Summer Olympics
Great Britain at the Paralympics

Nations at the 1996 Summer Paralympics
Paralympics
1996